Miike Snow is the debut album by Swedish indie pop band Miike Snow. It was released in the United States on 22 September 2009 by Downtown Records and in the United Kingdom on 26 October 2009 by Columbia Records, reaching number ninety-five on the UK Albums Chart. A deluxe edition was released on the iTunes Store in the US and Australia on 13 April 2010 and in Japan on 26 May 2010, including remixes of past tracks and "The Rabbit".

Singles
The first single to be taken from the album was "Animal", released on 17 February 2009, which reached as far as number ninety-eight on the UK Singles Chart. "Black & Blue", the album's second single, was released on 15 October 2009 and became the band's most successful single to date when it peaked at number sixty-four on the UK Singles Chart. Third single "Silvia" was released on 22 January 2010 in the UK, but failed to break the top 100 and instead peaked at number 154.

Track listing

Personnel
 Miike Snow – vocals, production, mixing
 Niklas Flyckt – mixing (tracks 7, 10)
 Anders Hvenare – mixing (tracks 1–6, 8, 9, 11)
 Ted Jensen – mastering
 Sebastian Mlynarski – innersleeve, band portraits
 Dirk Vandenberk – cover image photography

Charts

Weekly charts

Year-end charts

Release history

References

2009 debut albums
Columbia Records albums
Downtown Records albums
Miike Snow albums
European Border Breakers Award-winning albums